Velai Kidaichuduchu is a 1990 Indian Tamil-language crime action film written and directed by P. Vasu. The film stars Sathyaraj and Gautami. It was released on 15 August 1990. The film was remade in Telugu as Assembly Rowdy (1991), in Kannada as Rowdy & MLA (1991) and in Hindi as Loafer (1996).

Plot 

The film starts with Gautami visiting a village and remembering the past as the film takes us to a flashback. The village would have been a victim to a local don named Baasha whose atrocities go unchecked even by the police. Most of the policemen would either accept bribes or get killed by him. Palanisamy's family relocates to this village. He questions the riots happening in the village and develops enmity with Baasha. How Palanisamy saves the village from the Baasha and his boss forms the rest of the story. In the end, Sathyaraj kills Purushothaman and dies while hoisting a flag.

Cast 

 Sathyaraj as Palanisamy
 Gautami
 Vijayakumar
 Sumithra
 Anandaraj as Baasha
 R. Sarathkumar as Purushothaman
 Mansoor Ali Khan as Maari
 Goundamani
 Priya
 Pandu
 Poornam Viswanathan as Advocate
 Rocky as Muniyandi
 Sethu Vinayagam
 Vijay Krishnaraj
Thilak
 Santhana Bharathi as Speaker
 Mohan V. Natarajan as Survey Officer

Soundtrack 
The soundtrack was composed by Hamsalekha, lyrics written by Vaali.

Reception 
N. Krishnaswamy of The Indian Express said, "There is nothing new in this line, but the rhetoric that accompanies this ploy in P. Vasu's Velai Kidaichuduchu is a little different".

References

External links 
 

1990 films
1990s crime action films
1990s Tamil-language films
Films directed by P. Vasu
Films scored by Hamsalekha
Indian crime action films
Tamil films remade in other languages